Gibbsia is a genus of flowering plants belonging to the family Urticaceae.

Its native range is New Guinea.

The genus name of Gibbsia is in honour of Lilian Gibbs (1870–1925), a British botanist, it was first published and described in 'A Contribution to the Phytogeography and Flora of the Arfak Mountains' (Fl. Arfak Mts.) on page 129 in 1917.

Known species, according to Kew;
 Gibbsia carstenszensis 
 Gibbsia insignis  (the type species)

Description
Mainly shrubs, has alternate leaves, which are crenate (wavy toothed) and serrate (saw toothed). They are densely arachnoid (have appearance of cobwebs) below, so much that they look white underneath.
They are dioecious (producing male or female gametes), the flowers are monoecious (having separate staminate and carpellate flowers which are always found on the same plant), in small axillary androgynous cymules, minute bracts, ovate, scarious (Dry and membranous). The male flowers have perianths which are partite (divided to or nearly to the base), the 5 segments are valvate, ovate and have 5 stamens, with a rudimentary ovary.
The female flowers have a perianth which is broadly cupular, persistent and adinate at the base of the ovoid and very oblique (slanting) ovary.
The stigma is sub-apical (near tip), sessile (flowers growing straight from the stem) and discoid (resembling a disc or plate).
The fruit (or seed capsule) maybe drupaceous (having a fleshy-like outer part), small and very oblique.

Habitat
They are found on the mountains of western New Guinea.

References

External links
  has an illustration of the plant

Urticaceae
Urticaceae genera
Plants described in 1917
Flora of New Guinea